Syed Muhammad Ali Shah Jamot is a Pakistani politician who has been a Member of the Senate of Pakistan, since March 2018.

Political career
Jamot was elected to the Senate of Pakistan as a candidate of Pakistan Peoples Party on general seat from Sindh in 2018 Pakistani Senate election. He took oath as Senator on 12 March 2018.

References

Living people
Jamote people
Pakistan People's Party politicians
Members of the Senate of Pakistan
Year of birth missing (living people)